Lying to the Moon is the debut studio album of American country music singer Matraca Berg. It was released in September 1990 via RCA Records Nashville. The album accounted for the singles "Baby, Walk On", "The Things You Left Undone", "I Got It Bad", and "I Must Have Been Crazy". Berg co-wrote all ten of the tracks.

Content
The album's first two singles, "Baby, Walk On" and "The Things You Left Undone," both peaked at 36 on the Billboard Hot Country Singles & Tracks (now Hot Country Songs) charts. Following these were "I Got It Bad" and "I Must Have Been Crazy" at 43 and 55 respectively. The album itself reached number 43 on Top Country Albums.

"Baby, Walk On" was later recorded as "Walk On" by Linda Ronstadt on her 1995 album Feels Like Home. Trisha Yearwood recorded the title track on her 1993 album The Song Remembers When. Pam Tillis recorded "Calico Plains" for her 1994 CD "Sweethearts Dance"

Critical reception
Mark A. Humphrey of Allmusic gave the album four-and-a-half stars out of five, saying that she "sometimes delivers with brio." Alanna Nash of Entertainment Weekly rated it A-plus, saying that "Berg proves herself to be a songwriter of uncommon maturity" and calling her "unquestionably the first true country femme fatale of the '90s."

Track listing
All songs written by Matraca Berg and Ronnie Samoset except where noted.

Personnel
As listed in liner notes.
Sam Bush – mandolin, fiddle
Bruce Bouton – steel guitar, Dobro, Weissenborn
Clara Callaway – background vocals
Coleida Callaway – background vocals
Sudie Callaway – background vocals
John Catchings – cello
Ashley Cleveland – background vocals
Dan Dugmore – steel guitar, Dobro
Rob Hajacos – fiddle
Emmylou Harris – background vocals
Bernie Leadon – acoustic guitar, banjo, mandolin, mandola, mandocello
Josh Leo – acoustic guitar
Tracy Nelson – background vocals
Gary Prim – keyboards
Lisa Silver – fiddle
Harry Stinson – drums, percussion, background vocals
Bobby Taylor – oboe
Wendy Waldman – background vocals
Biff Watson – acoustic guitar
Willie Weeks – bass guitar, "cheap fretless bass"
John Willis – electric guitar, acoustic guitar

Chart performance

References

1990 debut albums
Albums produced by Josh Leo
Matraca Berg albums
RCA Records albums
Albums produced by Wendy Waldman